The Taiwan independence movement is a political movement which advocates the formal declaration of an independent and sovereign Taiwanese state, as opposed to Chinese unification or the status quo in Cross-Strait relations.

Currently, Taiwan's political status is ambiguous. China currently claims it is a province of the People's Republic of China (PRC), whereas the current Tsai Ing-wen administration of Taiwan maintains that Taiwan is already an independent country as the Republic of China (ROC) and thus does not have to push for any sort of formal independence. As such, the ROC consisting of Taiwan and other islands under its control already conducts official diplomatic relations with and is recognized by 13 member states of the United Nations and the Holy See. On 23 July 2007, Secretary-General of the UN Ban Ki-moon rejected Taiwan's fifteenth membership bid to "join the UN under the name of Taiwan", citing Resolution 2758 as acknowledging that Taiwan is part of China in accordance to the 1971 resolution. Ban Ki-moon's statement was rejected by a number of Western governments, with the U.S. in the lead. These governments protested to the UN to force the global body and its secretary-general to stop using the reference “Taiwan is a part of China.” Ban Ki-moon realized he had gone too far in his statement, and confirmed that the UN would no longer use the phrase “Taiwan is a part of China.”

The use of "independence" for Taiwan can be ambiguous. If some supporters articulate that they agree to the independence of Taiwan, they may either be referring to the notion of formally creating an independent Taiwanese state or to the notion that Taiwan has become synonymous with the current Republic of China and is already independent (as reflected in the concept of One Country on Each Side). Some supporters advocate the exclusion of Kinmen and Matsu, which are controlled by Taiwan but are located off the coast of mainland China.

Taiwan independence is supported by the Pan-Green Coalition in Taiwan but opposed by the Pan-Blue Coalition, which seeks to retain the somewhat ambiguous status quo of the Republic of China (Taiwan) under the so-called "1992 Consensus" or gradually "reunify" with mainland China at some point.

The governments of the People's Republic of China (PRC) and the Republic of China (ROC) oppose Taiwanese independence since they believe that Taiwan and mainland China comprise two portions of a single country's territory. For the ROC, such a move would be considered a violation of its constitution. Both governments have formulated a "One-China Policy", whereby foreign countries may only conduct official diplomatic relations with either the PRC or the ROC, on the condition that they sever official diplomatic relations with and formal recognition of the other. The ROC's One-China policy was softened following democratization in the 1990s.

Background 
At the conclusion of the First Sino-Japanese War on 17 April 1895, Taiwan was ceded by the Chinese Qing Empire to the Empire of Japan via the Treaty of Shimonoseki. A number of prominent officials in Taiwan who opposed the treaty declared independence and formed the Republic of Formosa, which was dissolved when Japanese troops overran the capital Tainan on 21 October 1895. At the conclusion of World War II and the Second Sino-Japanese War in 1945, Taiwan was placed under the control of the Republic of China (ROC) on behalf of the WWII Allies. The ROC, then the generally recognized government of both China and Taiwan, declared Taiwan to have been "restored" to China; this is argued to have been an illegal act.

In 1949–1950, the Chinese Communist Party (CCP) drove the ROC government out of China and into Taiwan (plus some minor Chinese islands), during the events of the Chinese Civil War. At the time, no treaty had yet been signed to officially transfer Taiwan to China. The ROC selected Taipei as the provisional capital (of China) and declared "martial law" in 1949. The supposedly democratic institutions of the ROC were "temporarily" suspended.

With democracy suspended in ROC-controlled Taiwan, the Kuomintang (Chinese Nationalist Party) of the ROC, in reality, developed Taiwan into a dictatorship. The period of martial law that existed in Taiwan from 1949 until 1987 resulted in the unlawful convictions and occasional executions of thousands of Taiwanese and Chinese democracy activists and other dissidents. This period has become colloquially known as the "White Terror".

After 1987 Lieyu massacre, the Kuomintang released its hold on power and ended martial law in Taiwan. This was due not only to pressure from democracy/independence activists within Taiwan but also pressure from the United States due to its citizen Henry Liu having been assassinated by criminal triad members secretly trained and dispatched by the Republic of China Military Intelligence Bureau. From hereafter, independence-oriented parties were now able to gain control of Taiwan.

Democratic activism within Taiwan gave birth to a range of independence-oriented political parties. Most notable out of these is the Democratic Progressive Party (DPP), which has been democratically elected into power three times. The governing body of Taiwan still continues to identify as the "Republic of China", but many institutions have been occupied and occasionally changed by the DPP, which has led to a theory that "the ROC is Taiwan".

It is a point of contention as to whether Taiwan has already achieved de facto independence under the Constitution of the Republic of China amended in 2005. The PRC and the Kuomintang continue to argue that "the Chinese Civil War has not yet ended". These two political camps have developed a "1992 Consensus" in order to cement Taiwan's status as a province of "China". In retaliation, the DPP has been trying to develop a "Taiwan Consensus".

Current political situation in Taiwan

The polity that exercises real control over Taiwan is a collection of political parties that variously refer to their country as either "Taiwan (Republic of China)" or "China (Republic of China)". There is no real consensus within the country over the fundamental status of the country itself, with the country being divided between two main factions known as the "Pan-Blue Coalition" and the "Pan-Green Coalition". The Pan-Blue Coalition, led by the Kuomintang (Chinese Nationalist Party or KMT), believes that their country (including Taiwan) is China and does not acknowledge the legitimacy of the People's Republic of China (PRC), which they view to be an occupation of the rest of China by rebel forces; they refer to Taiwan, the place where they actually live, as "Taiwan, free area of the Republic of China". On the other hand, the Pan-Green Coalition, currently led by the Democratic Progressive Party (DPP), believes that their country is limited to the geographical definition of Taiwan (including Taiwan's satellite islands and the Penghu Islands), as well as perhaps some minor outlying islands, and does not actively claim sovereignty over mainland China.

Furthermore, the territorial dispute over Taiwan is connected to various other territorial disputes in East Asia, especially the Senkaku/Diaoyutai Islands dispute and the various South China Sea Islands disputes. For the former, this is because both the PRC and the Pan-Blue Coalition believe that the Senkaku/Diaoyutai Islands are part of the geographical definition of Taiwan, although they are currently under the control of Japan and have been under Japanese rule since the late 19th century; hence, the Chinese claim to the Senkaku/Diaoyutai Islands is simply an extension of the Chinese claim to Taiwan. Meanwhile, regarding the latter, Taiwan/ROC maintains control over a few islands of the South China Sea, and the Pan-Blue Coalition further claims sovereignty over all of the other islands of the South China Sea. Finally, another crucial detail of the territorial dispute over Taiwan is the fact that Taiwan/ROC maintains control over a few other non-Taiwanese islands assigned to China; the islands of Kinmen (Quemoy) and Matsu, which are under Taiwan/ROC control, are geographically defined as being parts of Fujian Province, China (within Taiwan/ROC, they are governed as parts of the Pan-Blue Coalition's own definition of Fujian Province, China).

Legal basis for Taiwan independence 
Taiwan independence is supported by the Pan-Green Coalition in Taiwan, led by the Democratic Progressive Party (DPP), but opposed by the Pan-Blue Coalition, led by the Kuomintang (KMT). The former coalition aims to eventually achieve full sovereign independence for Taiwan. Whereas, the latter coalition aims to improve relations with the Beijing government (PRC) — which it refers to as "mainland China" — and eventually "reunify" at some point.

Both parties have long been forced to precariously dance around the so-called "status quo" of Taiwan's political status. The DPP is unable to immediately declare independence due to pressure from the PRC and the KMT, whereas the KMT and PRC are unable to immediately achieve Chinese unification due to pressure from the DPP and its unofficial allies (including political factions within the United States (US), Japan, and the European Union (EU)).

The 1895 Treaty of Shimonoseki and 1951 Treaty of San Francisco are often cited as the main bases for Taiwan independence in international law, if such things as "self-determination" and the Montevideo Convention (on the Rights and Duties of States) are to be disregarded. These two treaties are not recognized by the Beijing government and the Pan-Blue Coalition of Taiwan.

Whereas the PRC usually dismisses self-determination and the Montevideo Convention as conspiracies against Chinese sovereignty, the two aforementioned treaties have strong legal bases in international law and have been recognized by numerous countries across the globe. Notably, the Treaty of San Francisco forms the primary basis of modern Japan's independence (from the WWII Allies), and largely dictates Japan's modern geopolitics.

The premise of citing these two treaties is that: a) Japan gained sovereignty over Taiwan in 1895, b) Japan lost sovereignty over Taiwan in 1951–1952, and c) Japan never indicated the "successor state" on Taiwan thereafter. Therefore, according to certain activists, this means that Taiwan is only controlled by the Republic of China on behalf of the WWII Allies, and does not constitute a part of the ROC's sovereign territory.

The Beijing government disregards these two treaties, claiming that: a) the Treaty of Shimonoseki has been nullified and b) the Treaty of San Francisco was illegal. Furthermore, the Potsdam Declaration and Cairo Communique are often cited as indisputable bases for Chinese sovereignty over Taiwan.

The PRC also emphasizes that the United Nations (UN) refers to Taiwan as "Taiwan, Province of China". However, this point is dubious given that it has a huge amount of influence over the UN as one of five permanent members of the UN Security Council. However, most countries do not recognize Taiwan, and only 13 have diplomatic relations with it.

People's Republic of China authorities also accuse the US, Japan, and the EU of interfering in "Chinese internal affairs", claiming that the United States is responsible for separating Taiwan from China, and is responsible for manufacturing "artificial" pro-independence sentiments within Taiwan. Most governments, including the U.S. government, claim to adhere to a so-called "One-China Policy", which is based on the Chinese "One-China Principle".

Most "developed" and "Western" countries consider Taiwan to be a self-governing state in reality. However, since recognizing the existence of an "independent Taiwan/ROC" provides some form of grounds for officially recognising Taiwan independence, China (PRC) usually rejects the main premise of the Montevideo Convention, which is that "there are certain realities that determine statehood" (irrespective of international recognition).

Within the Pan-Green Coalition of Taiwan, there are two main factions. The faction that is currently in power aims to attain official international recognition for the reality of "Two Chinas", where the PRC and the ROC can coexist; later, the ROC can gradually "transform" itself into a Taiwanese state whilst avoiding a major conflict with the PRC. Whereas, the other faction aims to directly achieve Taiwan independence through a more abrupt and complete overthrowal of ROC institutions within Taiwan, which the faction views to be illegitimate.

The use of "independence" for Taiwan can be ambiguous. If some supporters articulate that they agree to the independence of Taiwan, they may either be referring to the notion of formally creating an independent Taiwanese state, or to the notion that Taiwan has become synonymous with the current Republic of China from Resolution on Taiwan's Future and that ROC-Taiwan is already independent (as reflected in the evolving concept from Four Noes and One Without to One Country on Each Side); both of these ideas run counter to the claims of China (PRC).

The issue of Quemoy and Matsu (Kinmen and Lienchiang)

Background 

When the government of the Republic of China (under the Kuomintang) was forced to retreat to Formosa and the Pescadores (Taiwan and Penghu) in 1949, several Chinese (i.e. not Japanese) islands still remained under Kuomintang control. Because the Chinese Communist Party never gained control of the Kinmen, Wuqiu, and Matsu Islands, they are now governed by the Republic of China on Taiwan  as Kinmen County (Kinmen and Wuqiu) and Lienchiang County (Matsu) within a streamlined Fujian Province. The islands are often referred to collectively as Quemoy and Matsu or as "Golden Horse".

Historically, Kinmen County ("Quemoy") and Lienchiang County ("Matsu") served as important defensive strongholds for the Kuomintang during the 1950–1970s, symbolizing the frontline of Kuomintang resistance against the Communist rebellion. They represented the last Kuomintang presence in "mainland China". The islands received immense coverage from Western (especially United States) media during the First Taiwan Strait Crisis of 1954–1955 and the Second Taiwan Strait Crisis of 1958. They were very significant in the context of the Cold War, a period from 1946 until 1991 of geopolitical tension between the Soviet Union (and its allies) and the United States (and its allies).

Ever since the transition into multi-party politics (i.e. "Democratization") during the 1990s, Kinmen and Lienchiang counties have now essentially developed into two electorates that can be contested through democratic elections. Currently the two electorates are "strongholds" for the Kuomintang due mainly to popular opinion within the electorates, rather than brute control (as in the past). The two electorates have recently developed close relations with the mainland, which lies only around 2–9 km west from the islands, whereas Taiwan lies around 166–189 km east from the islands.

Significance of Quemoy and Matsu 
Quemoy and Matsu are unique and important for several reasons.
 The islands straddle the southeastern coastline of mainland China, only a few kilometers away from Fujian Province.
 The islands are geographically defined as being part of mainland China rather than Taiwan (aka "Formosa and the Pescadores").
 The islands are defined as comprising the truncated, streamlined Fujian Province (officially "Fuchien Province") of the ROC on Taiwan.

Quemoy and Matsu in Cross-Strait relations 
Reportedly, the local government of Kinmen County supports stronger business and cultural ties with mainland China, similarly to the Kuomintang, and views itself as an important proxy (representative) or nexus (focal point) for improving Cross-Strait relations (that is, in the favour of Chinese unification). In January 2001, direct travel between Kinmen County (and Lienchiang County) and mainland China re-opened under the "mini Three Links". As of 2015, Kinmen has plans to become a "special economic zone" in which free trade and free investment would be allowed between it and the neighbouring mainland SEZ of Xiamen. This might be accomplished in part by building a huge bridge connecting Kinmen to Xiamen, via the island of Lesser Kinmen (Lieyu); already, a bridge is being constructed between Greater Kinmen and Lesser Kinmen. Additionally, Kinmen has plans to become a "university island". In 2010, "National Kinmen Institute of Technology" was upgraded to "National Quemoy University". Kinmen County plans to establish several branches of mainland Chinese universities in Kinmen, and has bargained with the central Taiwanese (ROC) government so that universities in Kinmen don't have to be bounded by the same quotas as other Taiwanese universities in terms of admitting mainland Chinese students. In 2018, the local government of Kinmen County unveiled a new undersea pipeline linking Kinmen to mainland China, through which drinking-water can be imported. This business deal caused controversy in Taiwan and resulted in a "stand-off" between Kinmen County and the Mainland Affairs Council of Taiwan (ROC).

Quemoy and Matsu as part of Taiwan 

Within Taiwan, one camp believes that Kinmen County (Quemoy) and Lienchiang County (Matsu) should be abandoned from a potential independent and sovereign Taiwanese state. This view aligns with the aforementioned treaties and acts that do not define Kinmen and Matsu as being part of Taiwan. This same camp also believes that the PRC has only "allowed" the ROC to continue controlling Kinmen and Matsu in order to "tether" Taiwan to mainland China. The fact that the PRC propagandizes Kinmen and Matsu is evidence that this is true to at least a certain degree. In a hypothetical scenario where Kinmen and Matsu are abandoned by the Taiwanese state, they would likely be "ceded" to the People's Republic of China via a peace treaty, officially ending the Chinese Civil War.

Also within Taiwan, a second camp believes that Quemoy and Matsu belong to Taiwan. This camp believes that the ROC and Taiwan have become one and the same. By this logic, Taiwan effectively owns all of the same territories that the ROC is said to own. Among these territories is Quemoy and Matsu. If a potential Taiwanese state were to be created, this camp believes that the new country will actually be the successor state to the ROC, rather than an entirely new country. Therefore, if Taiwan independence were to be successfully achieved, then the islands of Quemoy and Matsu would hypothetically cease to be administered as "Fujian Province", and would instead simply be classified as "satellite islands of Taiwan" (much in the same way as Penghu).

Despite the differing views of these two camps, there is a general understanding throughout Taiwan that Quemoy and Matsu are not part of the historical region of "Taiwan", due to having never been governed under the following regimes: Dutch Formosa, Spanish Formosa, Kingdom of Tungning, Republic of Formosa, and Japanese Formosa. Additionally, Quemoy and Matsu experienced a unique history for several years as military outposts of the ROC, further separating the islands from Taiwan in terms of culture.

History of Taiwan independence
Many supporters of independence for Taiwan view the history of Taiwan since the 17th century as a continuous struggle for independence and use it as an inspiration for the current political movement.

According to this view, the people indigenous to Taiwan and those who have taken up residence there have been repeatedly occupied by groups including the Dutch, the Spanish, the Ming, Koxinga and the Ming loyalists, the Qing, the Japanese and finally the Chinese Nationalists led by the Kuomintang. From a pro-independence supporter's point of view, the movement for Taiwan independence began under Qing rule in the 1680s which led to a well known saying those days, "Every three years an uprising, every five years a rebellion". Taiwan Independence supporters compared Taiwan under Kuomintang rule to South Africa under apartheid. The Taiwan independence movement under Japan was supported by Mao Zedong in the 1930s as a means of freeing Taiwan from Japanese rule.

With the end of World War II in 1945, by issuing "General Order No. 1" to the Supreme Commander for the Allied Powers, the Allies agreed that the Republic of China Army under the Kuomintang would "temporarily occupy Taiwan, on behalf of the Allied forces."

Martial law period 

The modern-day political movement for Taiwan independence dates back to the Japanese colonial period, but it only became a viable political force within Taiwan in the 1990s. Taiwanese independence was advocated periodically during the Japanese colonial period, but was suppressed by the Japanese government. These efforts were the goal of the Taiwanese Communist Party of the late 1920s. Unlike current formulations, and in line with the thinking of the Comintern, such a state would have been a proletarian one. With the end of World War II in 1945, Japanese rule ended, but the subsequent autocratic rule of the ROC's Kuomintang (KMT) later revived calls for local rule. However, it was a movement supported by the Chinese students who were born on the Island and not associated with KMT. It found its roots in the US and Japan. In the 1950s a Republic of Taiwan Provisional Government was set up in Japan. Thomas Liao was nominally the President. At one time it held quasi-official relations with the newly independent Indonesia. This was possible mainly through the connections between Sukarno and the Provisional Government's Southeast Asian liaison, Chen Chih-hsiung, who had assisted in Indonesia's local resistance movements against Japanese rule.

After the Kuomintang began to rule the island, the focus of the movement was as a vehicle for discontent from the native Taiwanese against the rule of "mainlanders" (i.e. mainland Chinese-born people who fled to Taiwan with KMT in the late 1940s). The February 28 Incident in 1947 and the ensuing martial law that lasted until 1987 contributed to the period of White Terror on the island. In 1979, the Kaohsiung Incident, occurred as the movement for democracy and independence intensified.

Between 1949 and 1991, the official position of the ROC government on Taiwan was that it was the legitimate government of all of China and it used this position as justification for authoritarian measures such as the refusal to vacate the seats held by delegates elected on the mainland in 1947 for the Legislative Yuan. The Taiwan independence movement intensified in response to this and presented an alternative vision of a sovereign and independent Taiwanese state. This vision was represented through a number of symbols such as the use of Taiwanese in opposition to the school-taught Mandarin Chinese.

Several scholars drafted various versions of a constitution, as both political statement or vision and as intellectual exercise. Most of these drafts favor a bicameral parliamentary rather than presidential system. In at least one such draft, seats in the upper house would be divided equally among Taiwan's established ethnicities. In the 1980s the Chinese Nationalist government considered publication of these ideas criminal. In the most dramatic case, it decided to arrest the pro-independence publisher Cheng Nan-jung for publishing a version in his Tang-wai magazine, Liberty Era Weekly. Rather than giving himself up, Cheng self-immolated in protest. Other campaigns and tactics toward such a State have included soliciting designs from the public for a new national flag and anthem (for example, Taiwan the Formosa). More recently the Taiwan Name Rectification Campaign has played an active role. More traditional independence supporters, however, have criticized name rectification as merely a superficial tactic devoid of the larger vision inherent in the independence agenda.

Various overseas Taiwan Independence movements, such as the Formosan Association, World United Formosans for Independence, United Young Formosans for Independence, Union for Formosa's Independence in Europe, United Formosans in America for Independence, and Committee for Human Rights in Formosa, published "The Independent Formosa" in several volumes with the publisher "Formosan Association." In "The Independent Formosa, Volumes 2–3", they tried to justify Taiwanese collaboration with Japan during World War II by saying that the "atmosphere covered the whole Japanese territories, including Korea and Formosa, and the Japanese mainlands as well", when Taiwanese publications supported Japan's "holy war", and that the people who did it were not at fault.

The Anti-communist Kuomintang leader Chiang Kai-shek, President of the Republic of China on Taiwan, believed the Americans were going to plot a coup against him along with Taiwan Independence. In 1950, Chiang Ching-kuo became director of the secret police, which he remained until 1965. Chiang also considered some people who were friends to Americans to be his enemies. An enemy of the Chiang family, Wu Kuo-chen, was kicked out of his position of governor of Taiwan by Chiang Ching-kuo and fled to America in 1953. Chiang Ching-kuo, educated in the Soviet Union, initiated Soviet style military organization in the Republic of China Military, reorganizing and Sovietizing the political officer corps, surveillance, and Kuomintang party activities were propagated throughout the military. Opposed to this was Sun Li-jen, who was educated at the American Virginia Military Institute. Chiang orchestrated the controversial court-martial and arrest of General Sun Li-jen in August 1955, for plotting a coup d'état with the American CIA against his father Chiang Kai-shek and the Kuomintang. The CIA allegedly wanted to help Sun take control of Taiwan and declare its independence.

During the martial law era lasting until 1987, discussion of Taiwan independence was forbidden in Taiwan, at a time when recovery of the mainland and national unification were the stated goals of the ROC. During that time, many advocates of independence and other dissidents fled overseas, and carried out their advocacy work there, notably in Japan and the United States. Part of their work involved setting up think tanks, political organizations, and lobbying networks in order to influence the politics of their host countries, notably the United States, the ROC's main ally at the time, though they would not be very successful until much later. Within Taiwan, the independence movement was one of many dissident causes among the intensifying democracy movement of the 1970s, which culminated in the 1979 Kaohsiung Incident. The Democratic Progressive Party (DPP) was eventually formed to represent dissident causes.

Multiparty period 
After the lifting of martial law in 1987, and the acceptance of multi-party politics, the Democratic Progressive Party became increasingly identified with Taiwan independence, which entered its party platform in 1991. At the same time, many overseas independence advocates and organizations returned to Taiwan and for the first time openly promoted their cause in Taiwan, gradually building up political support. Many had previously fled to the US or Europe and had been on a blacklist held by KMT, which had held them back from going back to Taiwan. Where they had fled, they built many organisations like European Federation of Taiwanese Associations or Formosan Association for Public Affairs. By the late 1990s, DPP and Taiwan independence have gained a solid electoral constituency in Taiwan, supported by an increasingly vocal and hardcore base.

As the electoral success of the DPP, and later, the DPP-led Pan-Green Coalition grew in recent years, the Taiwan independence movement shifted focus to identity politics by proposing many plans involving symbolism and social engineering. The interpretation of historical events such as the February 28 Incident, the use of broadcast language and mother tongue education in schools, the official name and flag of the ROC, slogans in the army, orientation of maps all have been issues of concern to the present-day Taiwan independence movement. The movement, at its peak in the 70s through the 90s in the form of the Taiwan literature movement and other cultural upheavals, has moderated in recent years with the assimilation of these changes. Friction between "mainlander" and "native" communities on Taiwan has decreased due to shared interests: increasing economic ties with mainland China, continuing threats by the PRC to invade, and doubts as to whether or not the United States would support a unilateral declaration of independence. Since the late 1990s many supporters of Taiwan independence have argued that Taiwan, as the ROC, is already independent from the mainland, making a formal declaration unnecessary. In May 1999, the Democratic Progressive Party formalized this position in its "Resolution on Taiwan's Future".

In 1995, Taiwanese president Lee Teng-hui was given permission to speak at Cornell University about his dream of Taiwanese independence, the first time a Taiwanese leader had been allowed to visit the United States. This led to a military response from China that included buying Russian submarines and conducting missile tests near Taiwan.

Chen Shui-bian administration (2000–2008) 

In February 2007, President Chen Shui-bian initiated changes to names of state-owned enterprises, and the nation's embassies and overseas representative offices. As a result, Chunghwa Post Co. was renamed Taiwan Post Co. and Chinese Petroleum Corporation is now called CPC Corporation, Taiwan and the signs in Taiwan's embassies now display the word "Taiwan" in brackets after "Republic of China". In 2007, the Taiwan Post Co. issued stamps bearing the name "Taiwan" in remembrance of the February 28 Incident. However, the name of the post office was reverted to "Chunghwa Post Co." following the inauguration of Kuomintang president Ma Ying-jeou in 2008.

The Pan-Blue camp voiced its opposition to the changes and the former KMT Chairman Ma Ying-jeou said that it would generate diplomatic troubles and cause cross-strait tensions. It also argued that without a change in the relevant legislation pertaining to state-owned enterprises, the name changes of these enterprises could not be valid. As the Pan-Blue camp held only a slim parliamentary majority throughout the administration of President Chen, the Government's motion to change the law to this effect were blocked by the opposition. Later, U.S. Department of State spokesman Sean McCormack said that the U.S. does not support administrative steps that would appear to change the status-quo by either Taipei or Beijing as threats to regional security.

Former president Lee Teng-hui has stated that he never pursued Taiwanese independence. Lee views Taiwan as already an independent state, and that the call for "Taiwanese independence" could even confuse the international community by implying that Taiwan once viewed itself as part of China. From this perspective, Taiwan is independent even if it remains unable to enter the UN. Lee said the most important goals are to improve the people's livelihoods, build national consciousness, make a formal name change and draft a new constitution that reflects the present reality so that Taiwan can officially identify itself as a country.

Ma Ying-jeou administration (2008–2016) 
Legislative elections were held on 12 January 2008, resulting in a supermajority (86 of the 113 seats) in the legislature for the Kuomintang (KMT) and the Pan-Blue Coalition. President Chen Shui-bian's Democratic Progressive Party was handed a heavy defeat, winning only the remaining 27 seats. The junior partner in the Pan-Green Coalition, the Taiwan Solidarity Union, won no seats.

Two months later, the election for the 12th-term President and Vice-President of the Republic of China was held on Saturday, 22 March 2008. KMT nominee Ma Ying-jeou won, with 58% of the vote, ending eight years of Democratic Progressive Party rule. Along with the 2008 legislative election, Ma's landslide victory brought the Kuomintang back to power in Taiwan.

On 1 August 2008, the Board of Directors of Taiwan Post Co. resolved to reverse the name change and restored the name "Chunghwa Post". The Board of Directors, as well as resolving to restore the name of the corporation, also resolved to re-hire the chief executive dismissed in 2007, and to withdraw defamation proceedings against him.

On 2 September 2008, President Ma defined the relations between Taiwan and mainland China as "special", but "not that between two states" – they are relations based on two areas of one state, with Taiwan considering that state to be the Republic of China, and mainland China considering that state to be the People's Republic of China.

Ma's approach with the mainland is conspicuously evasive of political negotiations that may lead to unification which
is the mainland's ultimate goal. The National Unification Guidelines remain “frozen” and Ma precluded any discussion of unification during his term by his “three no's” (no unification, no independence, and no use of force).

Tsai Ing-wen administration (2016–present) 
The Democratic Progressive Party, led by Tsai Ing-wen, won a landslide victory over the Kuomintang on 20 May 2016. Her administration has stated she seeks to maintain the current political status of Taiwan. The PRC government continues to criticize the ROC government, as the DPP administration has refused to officially recognize the 1992 Consensus and the One-China policy.

Impact of the 2019–2020 Hong Kong protests

Background 
On 13 March 2018, 19-year-old Chan Tong-Kai confessed to murdering his 20-year-old girlfriend Poon Hiu-wing in Taiwan when the Hong Kong police arrested him after he used Poon's ATM card to withdraw cash in both Taiwan and Hong Kong. Because the murder took place in Taiwan, the authorities in Hong Kong had no jurisdiction to charge Chan with murder, but sentenced him for money laundering instead. Because Hong Kong is a special administrative region of China, the region cannot make agreements such as a mutual legal assistance treaty with Taiwan, thus making the transfer of Chan to Taiwan extremely difficult.

In February 2019, the Hong Kong government proposed an amendment to the Fugitive Offenders Ordinance and Mutual Legal Assistance in Criminal Matters Ordinance to allow the transfer of fugitives between Hong Kong and any place outside Hong Kong. Researcher Emile Kok-Kheng Yeoh argued that the establishment of the amendment would “subject Hong Kong residents and visitors to the jurisdiction and legal system of mainland China, thereby undermining the region's autonomy and Hong Kong people's civil liberties.” As a result, on 15 March 2019, the Anti-Extradition Law Amendment Bill Movement began in Hong Kong.

In response to the Hong Kong protest, the Chinese government urged strengthening control over Hong Kong in order to bring “stability and prosperity” back to the Special Administrative Region (SAR), which on 30 June 2020, the Chinese government passed the Hong Kong National Security Law to give mainland officials the authority to operate within Hong Kong to punish people whom committed the crimes of secession, subversion, terrorism, and collusion with foreign forces. Simultaneously, using Hong Kong as example, the General Secretary of the Chinese Communist Party, Xi Jinping, also warned Taiwan that unification was inevitable.

Hong Kong national security law 
The biggest threat to Hongkongers posed by the Hong Kong national security law was the level of control that the Chinese government has over Hong Kong. Just one day after the establishment of the law, about 370 protestors were arrested, including 10 under the new law. Hatred towards the government of Beijing or Hong Kong was also defined as a serious crime, that people could be punished to the maximum of life imprisonment. American journalist John Pomfret viewed this legislation as “a blueprint for dealing with Taiwan,” and argued that similar legislation may also be imposed in Taiwan if unified.

According to the survey organized by APF Canada and RIWI in August 2020, it showed that there was a positive correlation between concerns for Taiwan's national security and agreement that the PRC has violated the “one country, two systems” principle. Overall, about 66 percent of the people express certain level of concern (from slight to extreme), and only 34 percent showed “not at all concerned.” Within that, majority of those who showed concerns either identified themselves as Taiwanese or a supporter of the DPP.

2020 Taiwanese general election 
One significant impact in Taiwan was the increasing support to Tsai Ing-wen, the seventh president of Taiwan and a member of the Democratic Progressive Party (DPP). Bonnie Glaser, an analyst of Chinese politics, believes that the circumstances in Hong Kong "resonated with Taiwan voters." President Tsai was aware of this concern, so about 3 months after the protest began in Hong Kong, President Tsai announced her position and view about the protests on her Twitter account:We stand with all freedom-loving people of #HongKong. In their faces, we see the longing for freedom, & are reminded that #Taiwan's hard-earned democracy must be guarded & renewed by every generation. As long as I'm President, “one country, two systems” will never be an option.

In January 2020, Tsai was reelected president of Taiwan.

Significance 

Domestically, the issue of independence has dominated Taiwanese politics for the past few decades. This is also a grave issue for mainland China. The creation of a Taiwanese state is formally the goal of the Taiwan Solidarity Union and former President Lee Teng-hui. Although the Democratic Progressive Party was originally also an advocate for both the idea of a Taiwanese state and Taiwan independence, they now take a middle line in which a sovereign, independent Taiwan is identified with the "Republic of China (Taiwan)" and its symbols.

This movement also has international significance, because the PRC has stated, or implied, that it will force unification by taking military action against Taiwan under one of these five conditions: (1) Taiwan makes a formal declaration of independence, (2) Taiwan forges a military alliance with any foreign power, (3) internal turmoil arises in Taiwan, (4) Taiwan gains weapons of mass destruction, or (5) Taiwan shows no will to negotiate on the basis of "one China". The PRC government warned that if the situation in Taiwan were to become "worse", it will not look on "indifferently". Such a military action would pose the threat of a superpower conflict in East Asia. Under the terms of Taiwan Relations Act, United States shall provide Taiwan with arms of a defensive character. However, Taiwan Relations Act does not oblige US to provide military intervention. While so, military intervention could still be sought should a formal declaration of war be made by the President of the United States in an act of Congress signed by the President.

Responses 
The questions of independence and the island's relationship to mainland China are complex and inspire very strong emotions among Taiwanese people. There are some who continue to maintain the KMT's position, which states that the ROC is the sole legitimate government for all of China (of which they consider Taiwan to be a part), and that the aim of the government should be eventual unification of the mainland and Taiwan under the rule of the ROC. Some argue that Taiwan has been, and should continue to be, completely independent from China and should become a Taiwanese state with a distinct name. Then, there are numerous positions running the entire spectrum between these two extremes, as well as differing opinions on how best to manage either situation should it ever be realized.

On 25 October 2004, in Beijing, the U.S. Secretary of State Colin Powell said Taiwan is “not sovereign,” provoking strong comments from both the Pan-Green and Pan-Blue coalitions – but for very different reasons. From the DPP's side, President Chen declared that "Taiwan is definitely a sovereign, independent country, a great country that absolutely does not belong to the People's Republic of China". The TSU (Taiwan Solidarity Union) criticized Powell, and questioned why the US sold weapons to Taiwan if it were not a sovereign state. From the KMT, then Chairman Ma Ying-jeou announced, “the Republic of China has been a sovereign state ever since it was formed [in 1912].” The pro-unification PFP Party Chairman, James Soong, called it "Taiwan's biggest failure in diplomacy."

Support for independence 

The first view considers the move for Taiwan independence as a nationalist movement. Historically, this was view of such pro-independence groups as the Tangwai movement (which later grew into the Democratic Progressive Party) who argued that the ROC under the Kuomintang had been a "foreign regime" forcibly imposed on Taiwan. Since the 1990s, supporters of Taiwan independence no longer actively make this argument. Instead, the argument has been that, in order to survive the growing power of the PRC, Taiwan must view itself as a separate and distinct entity from “China.”  Such a change in view involves: (1) removing the name of “China” from official and unofficial items in Taiwan, (2) changes in history books, which now portrays Taiwan as a central entity, (3) promoting the use of Hokkien Language in the government and in the education system, (4) reducing economic links with mainland China, and (5) promoting the general thinking that Taiwan is a separate entity. The goal of this movement is the eventual creation of a country where China is a foreign entity, and Taiwan is an internationally recognized country separate from any concept of “China." The proposed "state of Taiwan" will exclude areas such as Quemoy and Matsu off the coast of Fujian, and some of the islands in the South China Sea, which historically were not part of Taiwan. Some supporters of Taiwan independence argue that the Treaty of San Francisco justifies Taiwan independence by not explicitly granting Taiwan to either the ROC or the PRC, even though neither the PRC nor the ROC government accepts such legal justification. It is also thought that if formal independence were declared, Taiwan's foreign policies would lean further towards Japan and the United States, and the desirable option of United Nations Trusteeship Council is also considered.

The Taiwan Independence Party won a single seat in the Legislative Yuan in the 1998 legislative election. The Taiwan Solidarity Union was formed in 2001, and is also supportive of independence. Though it gained more legislative support than TAIP in elections, the TSU's legislative representation has dropped over time. In 2018, political parties and organizations demanding a referendum on Taiwan's independence formed an alliance to further their objective. The Formosa Alliance was established on 7 April 2018, prompted by a sense of crisis in the face of growing pressure from China for unification. The alliance wanted to hold a referendum on Taiwan's independence in April 2019, and change the island's name from the “Republic of China” to “Taiwan,” and apply for membership in the United Nations. In August 2019, another party supportive of independence, the Taiwan Action Party Alliance was founded.

Support for status quo

A second view is that Taiwan is already an independent nation with the official name “Republic of China,” which has been independent (i.e. de facto separate from mainland China/de jure separate from PRC) since the end of the Chinese Civil War in 1949, when the ROC lost control of mainland China, with only Taiwan (including the Penghu islands), Kinmen (Quemoy), the Matsu Islands off the coast of Fujian Province, and some of the islands in the South China Sea remaining under its administration. Although previously no major political faction adopted this pro-status quo viewpoint, because it is a "compromise" in face of PRC threats and American warnings against a unilateral declaration of independence, the DPP combined it with their traditional belief to form their latest official policy. This viewpoint has not been adopted by more radical groups such as the Taiwan Solidarity Union, which favor only the third view described above and are in favor of a Republic or State of Taiwan.  In addition, many members of the Pan-Blue Coalition are rather suspicious of this view, fearing that adopting this definition of Taiwan independence is merely an insincere stealth tactical effort to advance desinicization and the third view of Taiwan independence.  As a result, supporters of Pan-Blue tend to make a clear distinction between Taiwan independence and Taiwan sovereignty, while supporters of Pan-Green tend to try to blur the distinction between the two.

Most Taiwanese and political parties of the ROC support the status quo, and recognize that this is de facto independence through sovereign self-rule. Even among those who believe Taiwan is and should remain independent, the threat of war from PRC softens their approach, and they tend to support maintaining the status quo rather than pursuing an ideological path that could result in war with the PRC. When President Lee Teng-hui put forth the two-states policy, he received 80% support. A similar situation arose when President Chen Shui-bian declared that there was "one country on each side" of the Taiwan Strait. To this day, the parties disagree, sometimes bitterly, on such things as territory, name (R.O.C. or Taiwan), future policies, and interpretations of history. The Pan-Blue Coalition and the PRC believe that Lee Teng-hui and Chen Shui-bian are intent on publicly promoting a moderate form of Taiwan independence in order to advance secretly deeper forms of Taiwan independence, and that they intend to use popular support on Taiwan for political separation to advance notions of cultural and economic separation.

Opposition to independence 

The third view, put forward by the government of the PRC and Nationalists of the KMT, defines Taiwan independence as "splitting Taiwan from China, causing division of the nation and the people." What PRC claims by this statement is somewhat ambiguous according to supporters of Taiwanese independence, as some statements by the PRC seem to identify China solely and uncompromisingly with the PRC. Others propose a broader and more flexible definition suggesting that both mainland China and Taiwan are parts that form one cultural and geographic entity, although divided politically as a vestige of the Chinese Civil War. The PRC considers itself the sole legitimate government of all China, and the ROC to be a defunct entity replaced in the Communist revolution that succeeded in 1949. Therefore, assertions that the ROC is a sovereign state are construed as support for Taiwan independence, so are proposals to change the name of the ROC. Such a name change is met with even more disapproval since it rejects Taiwan as part of the greater China entity (as one side of a still-unresolved Chinese civil war). The ROC used to be recognized by the UN as the sole legal government of China until 1971. In that year, the UN Resolution 2758 was passed, and the PRC became recognized as the legal government of China by the UN. During PRC President Hu Jintao's visit to the United States on 20 April 2006, U.S. President George W. Bush reaffirmed to the world that the U.S. would uphold its One-China policy. Chinese nationalists have called the Taiwan independence movement and its supporters to be hanjian (traitors).

Opinion polls 
In an opinion poll conducted in Taiwan by the Mainland Affairs Council in 2019, 27.7% of respondents supported Taiwan's independence: 21.7% said that the status quo has to be maintained for now but Taiwan should become independent in the future, while 6% said that independence must be declared as soon as possible. 31% of respondents supported the current situation as it is, and 10.3% agreed to unification with the mainland with 1.4% saying that it should happen as soon as possible.

Several polls have indicated an increase in support of Taiwanese independence in the three decades after 1990. In a Taiwanese Public Opinion Foundation poll conducted in June 2020, 54% of respondents supported de jure independence for Taiwan, 23.4% preferred maintaining the status quo, 12.5% favored unification with China, and 10% did not hold any particular view on the matter. This represented the highest level of support for Taiwanese independence since the survey was first conducted in 1991. A later TPOF poll in 2022 showed similar results. The Election Study Center, NCCU Taiwan Independence vs. Unification with the Mainland Survey shows a steady increase in respondents choosing "maintain the status quo and move toward
independence in the future" since it started in 1994. However, the option "maintain the status quo indefinitely" had a similar increase in the same period and the most popular option was "maintain the status quo and decide in the future between
independence or unification" every year between 1994 and 2022. The option "independence as soon as possible" never went above 10% in the same time period. "unification as soon as possible" has been more unpopular – never going above 4.5%.

See also 

 Four-Stage Theory of the Republic of China
 Foreign relations of Taiwan
 History of the Republic of China
 China and the United Nations
 Taiwanese nationalism
 Three Communiqués
 Opinion polling on Taiwanese identity

Notes

References

Further reading 

 Bush, R. & O'Hanlon, M. (2007). A War Like No Other: The Truth About China's Challenge to America. Wiley. 
 Bush, R. (2006). Untying the Knot: Making Peace in the Taiwan Strait. Brookings Institution Press. 
 Carpenter, T. (2006). America's Coming War with China: A Collision Course over Taiwan. Palgrave Macmillan. 
 Cole, B. (2006). Taiwan's Security: History and Prospects. Routledge. 
 Copper, J. (2006). Playing with Fire: The Looming War with China over Taiwan. Praeger Security International General Interest. 
 Federation of American Scientists et al. (2006). Chinese Nuclear Forces and U.S. Nuclear War Planning
 Gill, B. (2007). Rising Star: China's New Security Diplomacy. Brookings Institution Press. 
 Manthorpe, Jonathan (2008). Forbidden Nation: a History of Taiwan. Palgrave MacMillan. 
 
 Shirk, S. (2007). China: Fragile Superpower: How China's Internal Politics Could Derail Its Peaceful Rise. Oxford University Press. 
 Tsang, S. (2006). If China Attacks Taiwan: Military Strategy, Politics and Economics. Routledge. 
 Tucker, N.B. (2005). Dangerous Strait: the U.S.-Taiwan-China Crisis. Columbia University Press.

External links 
 World United Formosans for Independence official website

 
Taiwanese nationalism
Taiwan under Republic of China rule
Independence movements
Public policy proposals